Craig Riedel (born May 23, 1966) is the state representative for the 82nd District of the Ohio House of Representatives. He is a Republican. The district consists Defiance, Paulding and Van Wert counties as well as a portion of Auglaize County.

Life and career
Riedel was born in Oberlin, Ohio and raised in Attica, Ohio on a family farm, before attending Ohio State University where he received a degree in civil engineering. He worked as an engineer for over twenty five years with Nucor Vulcraft Group, located in Defiance.

In 2015, Riedel retired, but continued to remain active in his community prior to being elected to public office.  He is married with a son and a daughter and resides in Defiance, Ohio.  Riedel attended Defiance High School.

Ohio House of Representatives
In 2016, state Representative Tony Burkley was up for a third term, however Riedel decided to run against him for the Republican nomination.  In the campaign, Riedel defeated Burkley, 53% to 47%, winning three of the four counties in the district.  Burkley was the only incumbent to lose that year.

Riedel was unopposed in the general election, and was sworn into office on January 3, 2017.

In 2019, Riedel co-sponsored legislation that would ban abortion in Ohio and criminalize what they called "abortion murder". Doctors who performed abortions in cases of ectopic pregnancy and other life-threatening conditions would be exempt from prosecution only if they "[took] all possible steps to preserve the life of the unborn child, while preserving the life of the woman. Such steps include, if applicable, attempting to reimplant an ectopic pregnancy into the woman's uterus". Reimplantation of an ectopic pregnancy is not a recognized or medically feasible procedure.

References

External links
Ohio State Representative Craig Riedel official site

21st-century American politicians
Living people
Republican Party members of the Ohio House of Representatives
Ohio State University College of Engineering alumni
People from Defiance, Ohio
People from Seneca County, Ohio
1966 births
Candidates in the 2022 United States House of Representatives elections